The MobiBLU Cube2 is an MP3 player, and the successor to the MobiBLU DAH-1500i cube. It possesses all of the features of the original cube, yet in addition has a color OLED screen that is capable of displaying both photos and videos. The cube itself is only slightly larger than the original cube, now being 25.4 mm (1 inch) cubed instead of 24 mm (0.94 inches) cubed. Other cosmetic differences include rounded corners, rubbery buttons, and a 96x96 pixel screen (as opposed to 96x64). It is sold in 1 or 2 GB versions.

 PlaysForSure and Podcast Ready
 MSV (converted from WMA, ASF, and MPG) video playback
 JPG and MSJ (a converted format) image playback
 FM Radio/Voice Recorder (MP3 format)
 MP3/WMA/WMA-DRM/Ogg Vorbis Playback
 Bright 65K OLED Display Screen
 Customizable EQ
 Approximated 10 and 5 hours of audio and video (respectively) Li-Polymer battery life
 Clock
 SRS WOW HD Sound (Simulated 3D Sound)
 USB 2.0 transfer speeds of 25 Mbit/s
 Firmware Upgradeable

Accessories
The Cube2 sports twelve different accessories, most of which are the same accessories for the original Cube.

 Neck Strap Earphone (standard)
 USB/Charger Cable (standard)
 Cube2 Protective "Crate" Case (standard, cube-shaped)
 Cube2 Protective Case 4 Pack (containing pink, black, clear and blue cases)
 AC Charger
 Mini Jack (smaller, simpler USB/Charger jack)
 Portable Charger
 Finger Strap
 Cube2 Cradle
 Car Charger
 Speaker (cube-shaped)
 FM transmitter (cube-shaped)

See also
 MobiBLU DAH-1500i
 Q-Be

External links
 MobiBLU US - North America MobiBLU website.
 MobiBLU Germany/Austria/Switzerland - Central Europe MobiBLU website and Distributor.
 CNET Review
 PC Magazine Review
 Good Gear Guide Review

Digital audio players
Portable media players